George Retzer (March 14, 1883 – October 7, 1979) was an American wrestler. He competed in the Greco-Roman wrestling featherweight event at the 1912 Summer Olympics.

References

1883 births
1979 deaths
Olympic wrestlers of the United States
Wrestlers at the 1912 Summer Olympics
American male sport wrestlers
People from Clarion County, Pennsylvania
Sportspeople from Pennsylvania